The 1987 East Texas State Lions football team represented East Texas State University—now known as Texas A&M University–Commerce—as a member of the Lone Star Conference (LSC) during the 1987 NCAA Division II football season. Led by second-year head coach Eddie Vowell, the Lions compiled an overall record of 2–9 with a mark of 0–5 in conference play, placing last out of six teams in the LSC. For the first time in program history, the East Texas State went winless in conference play. The team played its home games at Memorial Stadium in Commerce, Texas.

Schedule

Postseason awards

All-Lone Star Conference

LSC First Team
Winfred Essix, Wide Receiver

LSC Second Team
Kevin Hedges, Offensive Tackle
Aaron Muehlstein, Defensive Back
Jarrod Owens, Running Back

LSC Honorable Mention
Gary Compton, Tight End 
Gary DeVaughn, Defensive Line 
Darryl Duffie, Defensive Line 
Joseph Hopkins, Wide Receiver 
Kyle Paschal, Offensive Guard 
Allen Roulette, Offensive Tackle 
Royce Slechta, Quarterback

References

East Texas State
Texas A&M–Commerce Lions football seasons
East Texas State Lions football